Colin Anderson (born 26 April 1962) is an English former professional footballer, predominantly playing on left side of defence or midfield.

External links 
 

1962 births
Living people
Footballers from Newcastle upon Tyne
English footballers
Burnley F.C. players
Torquay United F.C. players
West Bromwich Albion F.C. players
Walsall F.C. players
Hereford United F.C. players
Exeter City F.C. players
English Football League players
Association football defenders
Association football midfielders
Association football utility players
Dawlish United F.C. players
North Shields F.C. players